The Blanche river (in French: rivière Blanche) is a tributary of the Felton River which flows into the Baie Sauvage to the south of Grand lac Saint François which constitutes the head lake of the Saint-François River.

The course of the "Blanche River" crosses the territories of the municipalities of Milan, Nantes, Stornoway and Saint-Romain, in the Le Granit Regional County Municipality (MRC), in the administrative region of Estrie, on the Rive-South of the St. Lawrence River, in the province of Quebec, Canada.

Geography 

The main hydrographic slopes close to the "Blanche river" are:
 north side: Felton River, Grand lac Saint François;
 east side: Noire River, Glen River;
 south side: Turcotte stream;
 west side: Legendre River.

The Blanche River originates north of the village of Milan, on the north side of route 214.

The Blanche river flows over:
  heading east along (on the north side) route 214;
  northward, to the confluence of a stream (coming from the west);
  north, to Chemin de la Yard;
  northward, up to the municipal boundary between Milan and Nantes;
  towards the north, in the municipality of Nantes;
  north, up to route 161;
  north, winding up to its mouth.

The Blanche River empties at the confluence of the Noire River which is the start of the Felton River.

Toponymy 

The toponym "rivière Blanche" was officially registered on December 18, 1979, at the Commission de toponymie du Québec.

See also 

 List of rivers of Quebec

References 

Le Granit Regional County Municipality
Rivers of Estrie